David Serero (born 22 April 1981) is a Moroccan-French baritone opera singer. He has played more than 1,500 concerts worldwide, and lead roles in opera, theater and musicals such as Cyrano (Cyrano de Bergerac), Shylock (The Merchant of Venice), Othello (Othello), Nabucco (Nabucco), Don Quixote (Man of La Mancha), Richard III (Richard III), Napoleon Bonaparte, Escamillo (Carmen), Enrico (Lucia di Lammermoor), Amonasro (Aida), the title roles of Don Giovanni and Rigoletto and starred in more than 100 films and TV series. He has toured in America, Europe, Middle East, Asia and Russia. In 2017, David Serero was honored in Marquis Who's Who for outstanding achievement in the entertainment world and for his contribution for the betterment of contemporary society. He is a member of the Recording Academy (Grammys) and the Television Academy of Arts & Sciences (Emmys), for which he is both a voting member. In 2019, he is named one of the top most influential Moroccans by airline Royal Air Maroc, and received the 2019 Albert Nelson Marquis Lifetime Achievement Award. In 2020, he receives the Award for Diversity by the Unesco. He wins the 2020 BroadwayWorld Awards for Best Performer of the decade, Best Producer of a Musical of the decade, Best Producer of a Play of the decade. The Mayor of New York, Bill de Blasio, awards him with the Certificate of Recognition for his contributions to the City of New York.

Early life and education 

Born in Paris to a Moroccan Jewish family from Fez, Serero studied jazz piano at the American School of Modern Music and at the Bill Evans Piano Academy in Paris. He graduated from both of these schools as a pianist and arranger.  He lived in New York from 2001 to 2003, where he studied singing with teachers from Broadway and from the Metropolitan Opera and acting at the HB Studio where he played Stanley from A Streetcar Named Desire by Tennessee Williams, Uncle Louie from Lost in Yonkers by Neil Simon and Marc Anthony from Julius Caesar by Shakespeare. Serero moved to St Petersburg, Russia, to study at the Rimsky-Korsakov Music Conservatory where he made his debut as Scarpia (Tosca) and Germont (La traviata). Following these performances, he was invited by Valery Gergiev to be part of the Young Singers Academy of the Mariinsky Theater. In 2020, he receives the Award for Diversity by the UNESCO.

Career 

In 2006, Serero made his European debut in the role of Escamillo (Carmen) at the Brasov Opera and returned the following year to perform the Four Villains (The Tales of Hoffmann). Following these performances, he was named Ambassador of the City of Brasov. His American debut took place the next year, when he performed as Alfio (Cavalliera rusticana) and Canio (Pagliacci) in Harrisburg, Pennsylvania. In 2008, he performed Dr Malatesta (Don Pasquale) with the Centre Philharmonic Orchestra in Bordeaux, and returned to the Brasov Opera, where he received the Encouragement Prize from the Bizet Foundation for his performance of Zurga in The Pearl Fishers. In 2009, he performed Enrico (Lucia di Lammermoor) and Escamillo in Florida,<ref[>http://www.davidserero.com/files/Heritage.jpg </ref> and in July, was selected to be part of the opera competition Operalia, founded by Plácido Domingo, at the Budapest Opera and Pecs Opera.
In 2010, he performed more than 50 performances of the lead roles from the operetta La Périchole and La Grande Duchesse de Gerolstein in Paris. And also performed Zapata from the operetta Le Chanteur de Mexico in Nice. In June 2010, he performed a concert in front of the Eiffel Tower for more than 18 000 people. From September 2010 to June 2011, Serero performed at the Opera du Ranelagh in Paris, which included a concert with pianist Cyprien Katsaris. In April 2011, he sang at the Olympia in Paris. In June 2010, he performed three concerts in Vladikavkaz (Russia) with singers Zarina Maliti and Felix Tsarikati. In June 2011, he performed at the Tchaikovsky Hall in Moscow with Iossif Kobzon. That same month, he played the part of the bodyguard in the movie Chinese Zodiac CZ12, directed by Jackie Chan. In July 2011, he performed the lead role of the first opera in Hebrew, The Dybbuk, at the Kfar Blum Festival, Israel, and performed a concert at the Hadassah Hospital in Jerusalem for Israelis and Palestinians children. In September 2011, he performed a concert at the Synagogue of Nazareth in Paris for the European Day of Jewish Culture. In December 2011, he performed in Nouméa (New Caledonia) and in Saint Denis (Reunion Island).

In January 2012, he performed Valiente from operetta Andalousia in Lyon and in March, he performed the lead role of Don Quixote from the musical Man of La Mancha in Paris,  Tokyo and Deauville. He received the award of best Actor/singer as Don Quixote from the Dale Wasserman Foundation in Los Angeles.

In April 2012, he performed his debut at the Concertgebouw in Amsterdam.
In June 2012, he founded the first Paris Musical Film Festival with the City Hall of Paris.
In both July 2012 and 2013, he performed for the President of Israel, Shimon Peres, and performed a concert at the Felicja Blumenthal in Tel-Aviv.
In October 2012, he performed his West End debut at the Dominion Theatre in London.
In November 2012, he performed in Paris in the lead role of Happy Mac from Duke Ellington's only Broadway musical Beggar's Holiday. Serero also sang the title role in the first cast album recording. 
In January 2013, Serero wrote, directed and produced the musical You Are Not Alone, in which he starred with Jermaine Jackson. Serero also arranged and produced I Wish You Love,  Jackson's album of Jazz Standards. In this album they both recorded a duet on Autumn Leaves.
In April 2013 and 2014, he performed at the Royal College of Music in London for the Festival of Russian songs and was also a Jury member of the competition.
In May 2013, he released his solo debut album All I Care About is Love.
He also sang the French national anthem for French president, Nicolas Sarkozy.

In June 2013, he founded the 1st London Musical Film Festival at the Bush Hall.
In August 2013, he performed a concert series in Capri, Italy.

In September 2013, he performed in Singapore at the French Alliance.  In November 2013, he performed at the Wembley Stadium in London and performed a concert in St Petersburg. This same month he performed his One Man Opera Show at the Theatre La Bruyere and a concert at the Grand Synagogue of Paris La Victoire.

In December 2013, he made his solo Broadway debut at the Bernstein Theatre with his One Man Musical Show.

2014 

In January 2014, he shared the cover of Theatre & Performance magazine in London with Barbra Streisand; he released the album The Broadway Baritone, Volume 1, with the Prague Philharmonic Orchestra in April of that year.
In April/May 2014, he performed a UK Tour in London at the Leicester Square Theatre,  Birmingham,  Liverpool and at the Royal Northern College of Music in Manchester. During this tour, he was featured on London Buses.  In that same month, he recorded the anthem for the Brazil World Soccer Cup.
He performed his One Man Musical Show at the Theatre du Gymnase in Paris for more than 100 performances from May to September 2014; in June, he was featured at the RASIA Festival in Moscow.
In July, he released the album and the video recording of You Are Not Alone, the Musical performed with Jermaine Jackson in 2013, and a documentary called "I Wish You Love, the Making Of" about the recording of Jackson's new album.

In the summer 2014, he recorded all the Napoleon's love letters to Josephine and performed a reading in Paris. He was also starring in the French films Eva & Leon (Emilie Cherpitel) and Nous Trois ou Rien (Kheiron). In September, he released his new album The Crooner Baritone, The Frank Sinatra Classics. He is on the cover of A Nos Arts Magazine in France.
From October to December, he returns to Broadway with his One Man Musical Show at the Bernstein Theater and is selected in the final of the Duke Ellington Vocal Jazz Competition as part of the Duke Ellington Americana Jazz Festival in New York.

He released the single of his new musical Scarface, the musical that he wrote and produced to take place on Broadway by 2017. This musical is based on Al Capone's life and the eponym film made famous by Al Pacino.

From November 2014 to May 2016 he performed the part of Chef Bruno from musical TRUFFLES in New York. For Christmas, he performed his musical comedy Xmas for Jews – A Comic Jewish Tragedy at the Zanger Hall in New York.

He performed lead roles in several films in New York such as The Kingdom of the Alley (as Marco) and Ring Ring (as the burglar) by Stephen Skeel, Super Paradise (as Adam the Rabbi) by Nour Matimush, Capicola (as Ralphie) by Mark Aiello, Laundry Day (as Angelo the mobster) by Jake Peterson, Ransom (as Mr Butler) by Brendan Duffy, There will come soft rains (Alonse) by Danielle Boyd and Amarena (Benny's father) by Andrew Abballe.

In December, he performed a concert at the French Embassy of New York and at the American Sephardi Federation.

He performed "New York, New York" on the New Year's Eve TV show Le 31 tout est permis avec Arthur on TF1 in France.

2015 

In January 2015, he released the album David Serero chante Luis Mariano JAZZ!. He arranged and produced this album, performed in French language, dedicated to Luis Mariano.

He appeared in New York 180 (as Alfredo the tailor) by Hongkai Sun, Day to Night (as Saleem) in the horror film directed by Ana Pasisanos and produced by Larry Fessenden, Paisanos in Paris (as Francois) by Ernie Zahn, Near it all by Woody Lewis, Crime Scene: Do Not Cross (as Detective Jack) by Katie Huang, Speedy (as Ali) by Ameer Kazmi, Make it work / How we do it (as the executive) by Nicholas Bruckman with Adrienne C Moore, Gangs of New York – Blood Feuds for Discovery Channel by Andrea de Brito,  Alice in America (as the Lottery investigator), Tango Shalom (as the cantor) by Gabriel Bologna, Again (as James) by Omar Salgado, Overload (as Sal) by Mark Aiello, The Redemption (as the violent father) by Steve Carmona, Sorry Charlie (as Adileh's father) by Lawrence Sharp, Hooligans (as the deli owner) by Patrick Lizza, Suddenly Rich (as the real estate agent) for TLC TV, Whistleblowers (CIA Agent) for Spike TV.

In March 2015, he played the parts of Christopher Sly & Vincentio from The Taming of the Shrew by Shakespeare at the New York Public Library.

In April 2015, he starred as the lead in the commercial between Sotheby's and eBay partnership in New York.

In May 2015, he played the parts of King Edward and Ratcliff in Richard III by Shakespeare in New York with the Oxford Shakespeare Company directed by Ron Destro, and in that same month he played the lead role of Marcel Proust in the play "Proust & Joyce at the Hotel Majestic" at the French Consulate of New York.

In June 2015, he played Off-Broadway the lead role of Shylock from The Merchant of Venice by Shakespeare at the Center for Jewish History in New York to critical acclaim and is featured on Yahoo! Small Business for his expertise on Producing theater. He was the guest artist to perform at the New York Jewish Music Festival and performed the annual Gala at the National Arts Club of New York. He played the roles of Lewis the Dauphin and Robert Faulconbridge from King John by Shakespeare at the New York Public Library.

He releases the album Richard III, by Shakespeare, in French language adapted by Serero. In September, he performed for the New York Fashion Week and produces the debut album of Russian singer Zarina Maliti on his record label. He announces his new TV Series called "Napoleon in New York" for which he wrote and stars as Napoleon.

On September 26 and 27, he performed two open air concerts on Times Square for Best of France with the presence of French President François Hollande. He was also the Master of Ceremony of this event with the Moulin Rouge. On October, he released his new album Sephardi featuring Sephardi songs in Ladino language which he arranged and produced and a 100% vocal version of Habanera from Carmen opera in duet with beatboxer Mythe Boxe.

On November, he released All My Love is For You, his pop album which he entirely composed, performed, arranged and produced. In December, he performed a concert at Queens College in New York for the City University of New York.

2016 

In January, he plays the lead role of Shylock (The Merchant of Venice) at the Center for Jewish History in New York. The Jewish Week quoted David Serero's Shylock performances as one of the most notable along with Laurence Olivier, Al Pacino, Dustin Hoffman, Jacob Adler and Zero Mostel. In that same venue, he also starred as the title roles of Nabucco (Verdi's Opera Nabucco) in April and Othello (Shakespeare's Othello) in June Off-Broadway.

For his performance as Shylock, he receives critical acclaim and is featured in Bloomberg News.

He produces and releases the debut album Hunger Pains of Hip Hop artist Rob Cherry on his record label.

In March, he produces the 19th edition of the New York Sephardic Jewish Film Festival for the American Sephardi Federation at the Center for Jewish History. This same month he's invited to discuss the future of the music business with Pharrell Williams on AOL

He starts his radio show The Culture News - On the phone with David Serero with iTunes Radio.

He is featured on the cover of the Sephardic Issue and in the Jewish Week for bringing his Sephardic roots to Shakespeare and Verdi in New York.

In May, he sang the title roles in Don Giovanni and Rigoletto at the Carnegie Hall in New York. That same month he performed at the Jerusalem Post Conference in New York. In June he performed at the Blue Note Jazz Festival in New York. In September, he sang for the President of Portugal Mr Marcelo Rebelo de Sousa.

2017 

David Serero enters the prestigious Who's Who America 2017 for demonstrating "outstanding achievements in the entertainment world and has contributed significantly to the betterment of contemporary society." He performed a gala concert in benefit to Surgeons of Hope at the National Opera Center of America. He is a finalist of the Grand Prize 2017 edition of The French Entrepreneurs of Abroad (Les Français de l'étranger), in Arts & Culture category, by Air France. He is the producer of the 20th Anniversary Edition of the New York Sephardic Jewish Film Festival. He is one of the judges of the Featured International Singing Competition in New York. He performed a concert at the Fashion Institute of Technology of New York. David Serero performed at the Pomegranate Lifetime Achievement Award Ceremony in honor of Andre Azoulay where he performed Moroccan songs and the national anthem of Morocco. In April, he performed in Chicago at the Alliance Francaise of Chicago, Toronto (Canadian debut) and for the Soroka Medical Center Gala at the Pierre Hotel in New York. He performed the opening of the Israel Parade of New York. He is the guest in French acclaimed TV show Vendredi Tout Est Permis with Arthur on TF1 for a special "New York" where he performed "New york, New York" as well as a Moroccan song. He is the founder and artistic director of the American Sephardi Music Festival. He performed an open air concert on 60th street and Park Avenue in New York for Bastille Day organized by the Fiaf. After performing in Paris at the Comedie Bastille, he performed an open air concert on the Freedom Plaza for the Festival of Morocco in Washington DC, in Toronto and Montreal (Canada) for the Canadian Friends of Soroka Medical Center.
He is the book cover of Because I am a Jew - The Truth Behind Shylock by Alicya Oppenheim from the Center for Shakespeare Studies of Stratford-upon-Avon, in which he tells his approach of performing the character of Shylock. In December, he stars as Barabas from the Jew of Malta by Christopher Marlowe in New York. His radio show The Culture News - On the Phone with David Serero becomes aired on iHeart Radio and has done more than 200 interviews of celebrities.

2018 
In January, he plays the title role of Reb Dovidl Moysheles, the Yiddish King Lear by Jacob Gordin at the Angel Orensanz Foundation in New York in partnership with the Yivo Foundation. He adapted in English and directed this revival as well as the first Cast Album Recording of that play. He performed at the Russian Culture House of London, Rossotrudnichestvo, for the Stars of the Albion Festival He stars as the King Ahasuerus in the musical Queen Esther's Dilemma, which he directs and produces at the Center for Jewish History. He performed and hosted the 70th Anniversary of the World Health Day by the World Health Organization at the United Nations, New York.
He stars as Cyrano from Cyrano de Bergerac in New York and is the 1st French actor to play this role in English in America. He has written his own English adaptation and recorded the Cast Album Recording. In June, he stars as Don Giovanni's title role in his new adaptation in New York, Off-Broadway. He sang for the Edmond Rostand 2018 Festival with the French Military Orchestra in Paris. He plays Napoleon from the screenplay Napoleon by Stanley Kubrick, which he adapted for the stage.

2019 
In Morocco, he is awarded by the Trophy of Honor in recognition of his accomplishment to the culture in Morocco. He performs off-broadway the title roles of Nabucco (Nabucco), Romeo (in his own Jewish adaptation of Romeo and Juliet), Figaro (Marriage of Figaro). He is named one of the 15 most influential Moroccans worldwide by the Royal Air Maroc. He plays the part of Otto Frank, in Anne Frank a musical, which he directs and produces Off-Broadway. He writes and directs with Lisa Azuelos the musical Lost in the Disco, which he produces off-Broadway. He receives the 2019 Albert Nelson Marquis Lifetime Achievement Award

2020 
He receives the Award for Diversity by the UNESCO for his contribution to the Arts and Diversity. He releases his books Operation Odessa and From I Can't Breathe to Black Lives Matter: How George Floyd's Tragic Death changed America. He releases the following audio recordings: The Diary of a Madman by Gogol, The Megillah of Esther, The Greatest War Speeches of Napoleon Bonaparte, J'Accuse by Emile Zola. He records the part of Ludwig van Beethoven in his own one-man-play I, Beethoven for Beethoven 250th's Anniversary. He headlines at the Montreal Sephardic Festival, performs at the Louvre Museum for the Paris Fashion Week, and returns as the Producer of the NY Sephardic Jewish Film Festival where he performs in honor of fashion designer Elie Tahari. He receives the Morocco Day Award 2020 by the Moroccan American Network. He releases the first singles of his musical "Scarface, The Al Capone Musical", for which he arranged Jazz standards with Hip-Hop arrangements featuring Jazz, Opera and Burlesque elements.

2021 
He wins the BroadwayWorld Awards 2020 for Best Performer of the decade, Best Producer of a Musical of the decade (Anne Frank, a Musical), Best Producer of a Play of the decade (Romeo and Juliet in a Jewish adaptation by David Serero). The Mayor of New York, Bill de Blasio, awards David Serero with the Certificate of Recognition from the City of New York for his contribution to New York's cultural landscape, for enriching the performing arts sector, uplifted and inspired diverse New Yorkers. He receives the Award of Best Arranger and Producer from the Palm Beach International Music Awards for his Jazz Big Band adaptation of Thriller from his musical Scarface. He receives 6 nominations, in four categories, in the first voting round of the Grammy Awards (FYC) for Producer of the Year (Non-Classical), Best Musical Theater Album (for "Anne Frank, a Musical" and "Scarface, the Al Capone Musical"), Best Spoken Word Album (for "I, Napoleon"), Best Engineered Album (for "Scarface"). He directs and produces a feature documentary about fashion designer Elie Tahari. The film wins the London Fashion Film Festival (Best Fashion Documentary), Moscow International Design Film Festival (Jury Award), China Beijing Film Festival (Best Documentary Producer Award), Hollywood International Golden Film Award (Best Director Award), American Filmatic Arts Awards (Grand Jury Award Documentary Feature), Impact Docs (Award of Merit 2021), FFTG Awards (Best Fashion Film), Cinema of the World (Award for Best Documentary, Best Director, Best Cinematography, Best Documentary-Host), Berlin Independent Film Festival (Best Director for a Documentary Award), Eastern Europe Movie Awards (Best Producer Award, Best Director Award, Best Feature Documentary Award), The Cinematic Arts Redemptive Entertainment (CARE) Awards (Best First Time Director Award), and many more. It was selected at The Chelsea Film Festival (New York), The Palm Beach Jewish Film Festival, The San Antonio Jewish Film Festival, The Miami Jewish Film Festival, The Los Angeles Fashion Film Festival, The Dubai Independent Film Festival, The Long Beach International Film Festival, DOCUTAH Film Festival, The Boca Raton Jewish Film Festival, with a special selection from the Iran Film Festival among others. In Paris, he creates the Festival Napoleon, and awards the Napoleon Award of Honor to Jean Tulard, Thierry Lentz, Jean-Pierre Osenat and Christian Clavier. He performs a concert at the Dubai World Expo for Morocco and makes his debut in Yerevan, Armenia.

2022 
He returns Off-Broadway to star as Moses, adapts in English, directs, and produces the French musical American Premiere of "The Ten Commandments, The Musical" (Les Dix Commandements), studied with the french original cast member Daniel Levi, and receives New York Cultural Commissioner Laurie Cumbo to attend the performance. He receives the Musical Theatre Radio Award for theatrical excellence, the New York Shakespeare Award, and is named Honorary Person of the Year in Morocco by ArtPress. His documentary on Elie Tahari opens in movie theaters at Lincoln Center. He is named in the "40 under 40" Honoree list for the United States Business Elite Awards.

Film and television career

Television 
In television, Serero started his career in France with: Juste un pitch (2008), Code Barge (2008), Krach (2009), C'est la crise (2011), Mes amis, mes amours, mes emmerdes (2011), Interpol (2011), Des soucis et des hommes (2011), Las Vegas Hotel (2011), L'Attaque (2011), Platane (2011), Silences d'Etat (2012), RIS Police (2012), Profilage (2012), Royal Palace (2012). In America, he starred in Blood Feuds – Gangs of New York by Discovery Channel on American Heroes Channel (2015), On the Case with Paula Zahn, Suddenly Rich on TLC (2016), Whistleblowers on Spike TV (2016), Six Degrees of Murder on Discovery Channel (2016), Deadline: Crime with Tamron Hall on NBC (2016), The Hunt with John Walsh on CNN (2016), We Are New York WANY (2017), Pandora's Box on Discovery ID (2018) and Quantico on ABC.

Cinema
In films, Serero starred: Le Marchant de Miracles with Borys Szyc (2009), Le Mac (2011), The Day I Saw Your Heart with Melanie Laurent (2011), The Chef with Jean Reno (2011), Chinese Zodiac 12 with and directed by Jackie Chan (2012), Nous trois ou rien (2015), Eva & Leon (2015).

In New York he starred in: There will come soft rains by Danielle Boyd (2014), Capicola by Mark Aiello (2014), Laundry Day by Jake Peterson (2014), The Kingdom of the Alley and Ring Ring by Stephen Skeel (2014), Ransom by Brendan Duffy (2014), Amarena (filmed in Italian language) by Andrew Abballe (2014), Super Paradise by Nour Matimusha (2014), New York 180 by Hongkai Sun (2015), Paisanos in Paris by Ernie Zahn (2015), Near it all / How we do it by Nicholas Bruckman (2015), Crime Scene: Do Not Cross by Katie Huang (2015), Speedy by Ameer Kazmi (2015), Near it all by Woody Lewis (2015), Most Beautiful Island by Ana Paisanos (2015), The Redemption by Steve Carmona (2015), Sorry Charlie! by Lawrence Edmond (2015), Hooligans by Patrick Lizza (2015), Sheepshead by Ari Ben Avram (2016), Jihadi Street (2016), Tango Shalom, starring Lainie Kazan and Karina Smirnoff (2016), Overload Rock or Die (2016), Alice in America, starring Richard Mofe Damidjo (2016), Following Phil (2016), When I Sing (2017).

He was a consultant on the film La Verité si je mens 3.

Philanthropy 

Serero has performed at concerts to benefit charities including UNICEF, the Hadassah Hospital, Meir Panim, Jewish Deaf Association, Surgeons of Hope and Broadway Cares.  He has additionally brought opera programs to schools, hospitals such as the Children hospital of Paris and the Mount Sinai Hospital of New York and prisons.  He has been the president of Young Hadassah in France since 2011.
Serero created The Forbidden Talents (Les Talents Interdits) to bring back to life composers whose music was banned during the Nazi regime. As an Art collector, he published his collection of Movie Stills of American and French Actors.
He performed a tribute concert to Daniel Pearl at the Center for Jewish History in October 2015.
He performed at the B.B King Club in New York for the NDSS in March 2016.
In 2019, he donates part of his Judaica art collection to the Jewish Museum of Morocco, making it the largest donation of Judaica ever received in Morocco.

Discography 
 Cyrano de Bergerac - Live from New York (2018)
 Napoleon by Stanley Kubrick - Cast Album Recording (2018) 
 The Yiddish King Lear - Live from New York (2018)
 Queen Esther's dilemma - Live from New York (2018)
 The Yiddish King Lear - Cast Album Recording (2018)
 The Jew of Malta - Cast Album Recording (2018)
 Baritone Opera Arias (2018)
 The Jew of Malta - Live from New York (2018)
 All My Love is For You (2016)
 Othello - Live from New York (2016)
 Sephardi (2015)
 Richard III (performed in French) (2015)
 The Merchant of Venice (2015)
 David Serero chante Luis Mariano JAZZ! (2015)
 The Crooner Baritone, The Frank Sinatra Classics (2014)
 Napoleon's love letters to Josephine (performed in French) (2014)
 The Broadway Baritone, Volume 1 (2014)
 You are not alone, Live with Jermaine Jackson (2014)
 Scarface, The Musical (2014)
 All I Care About is Love (2013)
 David Serero as Don Quixote from Man of La Mancha (2013)
 Beggar's Holiday, the Duke Ellington Broadway Musical (2012)
 I Wish You Love with Jermaine Jackson (2012) 
 David Serero & Cyprien Katsaris, Live from Paris (2011)
 David Serero Live Jewish Music from Paris (2011)

Opera 

 Figaro (Nozze di Figaro)
 Nabucco (Nabucco)
 Rigoletto (Rigoletto)
 Escamillo (Carmen)
 Dr Malatesta (Don Pasquale)
 Eugene Onegin (Eugene Oneguin)
 Tonio (I Pagliacci)
 Alfio (Cavalliera Rusticana)
 Zurga (The Pearl Fishers)
 Four Villains (Tales of Hoffmann)
 Azrieli (The Dybbuk)
 Enrico (Lucia di Lammermoor)
 Amonasro (Aida)
 Don Giovanni (Don Giovanni)

Operetta 

 La Perichole
 La Grande Duchesse de Gerolstein
 Le Chanteur de Mexico
 Andalousia

Musicals 
 Otto Frank (Anne Frank, a Musical) 
 King of Persia, Ahasuerus (Queen Esther's dilemma) 
 Beggar / Happy Mac (Beggar's Holiday)
 King of the Sea (The Little Mermaid)
 Don Quixote (Man of La Mancha)
 You Are Not Alone with Jermaine Jackson
 Chef Bruno (Truffles, a Murder mystery)
 Christmas for Jews, a comic Jewish tragedy

Filmography 
 When I Sing (2018)
 Most Beautiful Island (2017)
 Hatikvah (2017)
 Sheepshead (2017)
 Jihadi Street (2017)
 Tango Shalom (2017)
 Overload Rock or Die (2016)
 Alice in America (2016)
 Following Phil (2016)
 All Three of Us (2015)
 Again (2015)
 The Redemption (2015)
 The three of us or nothing (2015)
 Paisanos in Paris (2015)
 New York Vertigo (2015)
 Winter Has No Sun (2015)
 Sorry Charlie (2015)
 Hooligans (2015)
 Crime Scene: Do Not Cross! (2015)
 Near it All (2015)
 Speedy (2015)
 The Kingdom of the Alley (2014)
 Eva & Leon (2015)
 Amarena (2014)
 There will come soft rains (2014)
 Ring, Ring (2014)
 Capicola (2014)
 Super Paradise (2014)
 Laundry Day (2014)
 Ransom (2014)
 Amarena (2014)
 There will come soft rains (2014)
 Chinese Zodiac CZ12 (2012). Directed by Jackie Chan
 The Day I Saw Your Heart (2011)
 Le Chef (2011)
  (2011)
 Le Mac (2009)
 The Miracle Seller (2008)
 The Boxer (2003)
The Italian Lover (2002)

Television 
 Quantico (2018)
 We Speak NYC (2018)
 Crimes of Fashion on Discovery ID (2018)
 Pandora's Box on Discovery ID (2018)
 Mysteries at the Museum on Travel Channel (2016-2017-2018)
 The Hunt with John Walsh on CNN (2017)
 Deadline Crime with Tamron Hall on NBC (2016)
 On the case with Paula Zahn (2016)
 Six Degrees of Murder on Discovery Channel (2016)
 Don Julio (2016)
 Whistleblowers on Spike TV (2016)
 Checked Out (2016)
 Suddenly Rich on TLC (2016)
 Rabid Beast on Animal Planet (2016)
 Blood Feuds Gangs of New York by Discovery Channel on American Heroes Channel (2015)
 Royal Palace (2013)
 Profilage (2012)
 R.I.S Police (2012) 
 Silences d'Etat (2011)
 C'est la crise (2011)
 Mes amis, mes amours, mes emmerdes (2011)
 Une famille formidable (2011)
 Ni vu, ni connu (2011)
 Interpol (2011)
 Des soucis et des hommes (2011)
 Las Vegas Hotel (2011)
 L'attaque (2011)
 Platane (2011)
 Les beaux mecs (2010)
 Krach  (2009)
 Code barge (2008)
 Juste un pitch (2008)

Theater 
 Cyrano (Cyrano de Bergerac by Edmond Rostand)
 Romeo (Romeo and Juliet by Shakespeare)
 Othello (Othello by Shakespeare)
 Christopher Sly & Vincentio (The Taming of the Shrew by Shakespeare) 
 Shylock (The Merchant of Venice by Shakespeare)
 Barabas (The Jew of Malta by Marlowe)
 Marcel Proust (Proust & Joyce at the Hotel Majestic)
 King Edward (Richard III by Shakespeare)
 Lewis the Dauphin & Robert Faulconbridge (King John by Shakespeare)
 Marc Anthony (Julius Caesar by Shakespeare)
 Dr Vaginski (The Mending Monologues by Derek Dujardin)
 Stanley (A Streetcar named Desire)
 Uncle Louie (Lost in Yonkers)

DVD 
 The Yiddish King Lear with David Serero. Live in New York (2018)
 The Jew of Malta with David Serero as Barabas. Live in New York (2017)
 Othello in a Moroccan style with David Serero as Othello. Live in New York (2016)
 Nabucco with David Serero as Nabucco. Live in New York (2016)
 The Merchant of Venice with David Serero as Shylock. Live in New York (2015)
 You Are Not Alone with Jermaine Jackson (2014)
 The One Man Musical Show by David Serero. Live on Broadway (2015)
 The One Man Musical Show by David Serero. Live in Paris (2014)
 Live at the Paris Synagogue (2013)
 Man of La Mancha with David Serero as Don Quixote (2012)

Bibliography 
 Cyrano de Bergerac adapted in English by David Serero (2018)
 The Jew of Malta adapted by David Serero (2017)
 Because I'm a Jew - The Truth behind Shylock (2017)
 Othello adapted in a Moroccan style by David Serero (2016)
 The Merchant of Venice in a Sephardi style adapted by David Serero (2015)
 Richard III adapted in French by David Serero (2015)
 Movie Stills of American and French actors from David Serero Collection (2014)
 Vocal score of Beggar's Holiday, Duke Ellington Musical (2014)

Awards 
 Musical Theater Radio Award for Theatrical Excellence (2022)
 40 Under 40 by the United States Business Elite Awards (2022)
 New York Shakespeare Award (2022)
 Honorary Person of the Year of Morocco by ArtPress (2022) 
 Palm Beach International Music Awards - Best Arranger and Producer (2021)
 Certificate of Recognition from The City of New York for Artistic and Cultural Contributions to New York (2021)
 BroadwayWorld Opera Award for Best Opera Singer of the Year (2021)
 BroadwayWorld Award for Best Performer of the decade (2020)
 BroadwayWorld Award for Best Producer of a Musical (2020)
 BroadwayWorld Award for Best Producer of a Play (2020)
 Award for Diversity by Unesco (2020)
 Albert Nelson Marquis Lifetime Achievement Award (2019)
 Stars of the Albion, London (2019)
 DIAS Entrepreneur - Lifetime Achievement Award (2018)
 Who's Who America (2017)
 Awards for French Entrepreneurs from Abroad - Arts & Culture category by Air France - Finalist (2017)
 The Dale Wasserman Foundation – Best Actor/ Singer as Don Quixote (2012)
 The French Union of Master Singers – Excellent Prize (2010)
 The Bizet Foundation – Encouragement Prize as Zurga from Pearls Fischer (2008)
 The City of Brasov – Artist Ambassador of the City of Brasov (2006)

Videography 

 Tomorrow's Mountain from Beggar's Holiday (2012). Directed by David Serero
 Autumn Leaves – Les Feuilles Mortes with Jermaine Jackson (2012). Directed by David Serero
 If I were a rich man from Fiddler on the Roof  (2013). Directed by David Serero
 If ever I would leave you from Camelot (2014). Directed by David Serero
 Habanera from Carmen with beatbox Mythe Box (2015). Directed by David Serero
 You Are For Me (2016). Directed by David Serero

References

External links 
 
 Official Website
 

1981 births
Living people
Singers from Paris
French operatic baritones
21st-century French singers
21st-century French male singers
Jewish opera singers
Jewish singers
French people of Moroccan-Jewish descent